Docent  is a Czech crime television series. Doc. Otto Stehlík tracks down a cold-blooded serial killer as an investigator with unconventional but all the more functional strategy. Stehlík and his professional partner Monika Fousová  represent a rather incongruous couple. Jan Malinda and Josef Mareš have written the script. Jiří Strach took over the direction. The first episode premiered on 5 February 2023 on ČT1. and was presented on 12 January in Prague's bio přítomnost. Director Strach revealed there that season 2 is in development and could start filming in the fall of the same year.

Plot
Unexpected circumstances lead docent Stehlík to the team of the Prague murder party, which is headed by the pragmatic Major Šera. Stehlík is a police academic and a specialist in the psychological profiling of criminals. He shares an office with problematic Captain Fousová. Their attitude towards life, investigative methods and personal esprit are completely different. Their differences still lead them to reveal the perpetrator of so far unsolved murders and to a surprising connection with the current case which is investigated by their colleagues Málek and Plesl.

Cast

Main
 Ivan Trojan as docent Otto Stehlík
 Tereza Ramba as policewoman Monika Fousová
 Ondřej Vetchý as investigator Milan Šera
 Matěj Hádek as policeman Jaroslav Málek
 Marek Taclík as policeman Dan Plesl
 Alois Švehlík	as Václav Stehlík, Stehlík's father
 Lenka Vlasáková as Anna Stehlíková, Otto Stehlík's ex-wife 
 Miroslav Etzler as medical examiner Jiří Hladký
 Jan Hrušínský as Miloš Fous, Fousová's father
 Josef Mareš as PhDr. Ing. Marek Tomášek, MBA
 Tomáš Kozák as Ing. Petr Volf, Ph.D.
 Elizaveta Maximová as Oxana Vosátková
 Petr Stach as Jan Vosátka
 Oldřich Navrátil as Bohumil Lukášek
 Peter Varga as Jiří Váchal

Episodes

References

External links 
Official site

Czech crime television series
2023 Czech television series debuts
Czech Television original programming
Television series about fictional serial killers
Czech television miniseries